The canton of Castanet-Tolosan is an administrative division of the Haute-Garonne department, southern France. Its borders were not modified at the French canton reorganisation which came into effect in March 2015. Its seat is in Castanet-Tolosan.

It consists of the following communes:
 
Aureville
Auzeville-Tolosane
Auzielle
Castanet-Tolosan
Clermont-le-Fort
Goyrans
Labège
Lacroix-Falgarde
Mervilla
Péchabou
Pechbusque
Rebigue
Saint-Orens-de-Gameville
Vieille-Toulouse
Vigoulet-Auzil

References

Cantons of Haute-Garonne